Central West Tunisia or in (Arabic language : الوسط الغربي التونسي ) is the region located at the Central West of Tunisia which assembles Three of the following states: Sidi Bouzid, Kairouan and Kasserine.

Geography
The Region Consider it as a dry and Rocky with many mountains around it Like Chambi mountain in Kasserine That is the largest one in the country as well Jebel Serj National Park a large mountain between Kairouan and Siliana, however the Region measuring an area of 22,377 kilometers square.

Demographics 

With 1,459,703 people, the Central West is the 4th populated region in the country. The most populated Governorates of the Central West are:

Cities and towns 

there are several cities and towns with population that exceed 50,000 Inhabitants Here are the top 10 populated cities:

Economy

Culture

References

Geography of Tunisia